Srushti Dange is an Indian actress, who has mostly appeared in Tamil films and  appears in a few Telugu and Malayalam films.

Career
Srushti Dange initially appeared in supporting roles, playing a victim in Myshkin's Yuddham Sei (2011), before playing a supporting role in the Telugu film, April Fool. Srushti made a breakthrough portraying the lead role in the romantic thriller Megha, winning mixed reviews for her performance in the title role. In 2015, she was seen in the horror film Darling, the psychological thriller film Enakkul Oruvan and Pu, a romantic film which launches Krish in the leading role.

In 2016, she appeared in four Tamil films: the Dharma Durai, Vijay Vasanth's Achamindri, the romantic comedy Navarasa Thilagam, in which she plays a medical student, and the Suseenthiran production Vil Ambu. In 2017, she made her Malayalam debut with the film 1971: Beyond Borders.

Filmography

Television

References

External links
 

Indian film actresses
Actresses in Tamil cinema
Actresses from Mumbai
Living people
21st-century Indian actresses
1993 births
Actresses in Malayalam cinema
Actresses in Telugu cinema